Roger Adams (1681–1741) of Chester was a printer and bookseller, and amongst the first printers of Welsh texts.  'Ystyriaethau o Gyflwr Dyn' (1724) was probably his earliest publication.

References 

English printers
Welsh literature
English booksellers
1741 deaths
Year of birth uncertain